The Ferrovie dello Stato Italiane (FS; Italian State Railways) Class 680 (Italian: Gruppo 680) is a 2-6-2 express steam locomotive; it was the direct ancestor of the very successful and appreciated Class 685.

Design and construction
The Class 680 was designed as the "normalized" successor of the famous Class 500 (reclassified by the Ferrovie dello Stato as Class 670) fast locomotives of the Rete Adriatica; in fact, even before the RA ended up being nationalized in the Ferrovie dello Stato in 1905, there was already a project (with the projected classification RA 550 for a fast 2-6-2 locomotive) which shared several similarities with what would end up becoming, under the FS ownership, the Class 680.

The Class featured the widespread Italian bogie, and the same Plancher compound engine of the Class 500, an arrangement in which the two high pressure (HP) and the two low pressure (LP) cylinders were paired together respectively on the left and the right side of the locomotive, with each pair being served by a single piston valve via crossed ports. This ingenious arrangement was simple, but it made the locomotive somewhat unbalanced and unstable, especially at higher speed.

The Class 680 was built from 1907 to 1909 in 151 units by Ernesto Breda, Gio. Ansaldo & C. and Berliner Maschinenbau, with the last two locomotives being built by the former company respectively in 1909 and 1911.

Service

A brief success
The first locomotive, when outshopped from the Ernesto Breda factory in 1907, was initially assigned the classification FS 6401, but a few days later it was reclassified FS 6801. Over the next years, new classifications with five and eventually six numbers (with the class and the running numbers separated by a full stop) were adopted, the class ending up as 680.XXX.

The Class 680 proved to be a thoroughly good locomotive, replacing the Class 670 from the most important services on the Rome-Naples and Florence-Rome railways.

However, its success was relatively brief, as in 1912 the Class 685, basically its simple-expansion and superheated version, entered service; the new locomotive was more powerful and had smoother riding qualities, and thus the recent Class 680 locomotives ended up obsolete.

Rebuilds and conversions
The last two locomotives built, the 680.150 and 151, had been fitted experimentally with a superheater from the start, but results had not been positive, as the theoretical increase in performance was offset by the reduction of steaming ability. Nevertheless, this experiment paved the way for a general rebuilding campaign for the whole class, in a bid to achieve the same performance as the Class 685.

From 1918 to 1924, seventy-three locomotives were rebuilt with a new small-tube superheater; initially allocated to the subclass 680.2XX, they were eventually reclassified in the new Class 681. A further fifteen locomotives (with two more being obtained by modifying two Class 681) also received larger HP cylinders ( instead of ); these, initially allocated to the 680.4XX subclass, were eventually reclassified Class 682. The latter were the maximum evolution of the Plancher compound engine for passenger trains.

In 1924 and 1925, the Class 682 locomotives were assigned to the shed of Ancona and subjected to comparative trials against the Class 685; the results proved that, although the former were slightly more powerful than the latter ( instead of ), they had higher consumption of water and coal, and did not ride as smoothly at high speed as the 685s. This resulted in the decision to stop any further rebuilds, and instead outright convert not only the remaining Class 680 locomotives, but also the 681 and 682, into Class 685 locomotives.

These conversions lasted from 1925 to 1933, at the end of which only four Class 680, twelve Class 681 and fifteen Class 682 remained unrebuilt, with all the remaining 120 locomotives becoming the subclasses 685.3XX and 685.5XX in the Class 685, and the separate Class S.685.5XX.

The last years
The unrebuilt locomotives continued to serve on secondary roles for the rest of their careers; before World War Two they were already being used sporadically, but during the conflict they were returned to active service. After the war, their withdrawals began, and by 1955 these were all completed.

Preservation 
One Class 680, the 680.037, survived in preservation; after a lengthy stay in Merano, she was eventually transferred to the Pietrarsa railway museum.

References

 
 
 

680
2-6-2 locomotives
Compound locomotives
Gio. Ansaldo & C. locomotives
Breda locomotives
Berliner locomotives
Standard gauge locomotives of Italy
1′C1′ n4v locomotives
Passenger locomotives